The Federal University of Petroleum Resources Effurun (FUPRE) in Delta State, Nigeria was established and approved during the Federal Executive Council meeting of 14 March 2007 and admitted its first set of undergraduates in 2008.

The university was established under the Federal Government of Nigeria initiative, to build a specialized university in the Niger Delta to produce middle and higher level manpower and expertise for the oil and gas sector. 

The National Universities Commission(NUC) approved sharing of facilities between the Petroleum Training Institute (PTI), Effurun and Federal University of Petroleum Resources Effurun until it moved to its permanent site on development of its main campus at Ugbomro, Uvwie Local Government Area Delta State, in 2010. 

FUPRE, Federal University of Petroleum Resources Effurun is the first petroleum university in Africa and sixth in the world.

Administrative structure
The administrative structure of the university consists of:
 Chancellor
 Pro chancellor
 Vice Chancellor
 Principal Officers of the University 
 Members of the Governing Council

Centres and administrative departments/units

Administrative departments/units
 Information and Communication Technology
 Counselling Centre
 Academic Planning Unit

Centres 
 Centre for Maritime and Offshore Studies 
 Centre for Safety Education 
 Centre for Research Innovation

Colleges 
The institution presently have two colleges with ten departments. The colleges are:
 College of Science
 College of Technology

The College of Science and College of Technology has started running its courses for its academic session.

Colleges, Departments and Courses
The Federal University Of Petroleum Resources, consists of two colleges which are College of Science and College of Technology. These Colleges are sub divided into 18 departments.

Below are a list of departments in FUPRE

College Of Science
 Computer Science
 Mathematics
 Chemistry
 Industrial Chemistry
 Physics
 Geology
 Geophysics
 Science Laboratory Technology
 Environmental Management and Toxicology

College Of Technology

 Petroleum Engineering
 Marine Engineering
 Electrical/Electronics Engineering
 Chemical Engineering
 Mechanical Engineering
 Petrochemical Engineering
 Natural Gas Engineering
 Civil Engineering
 Computer Engineering

Programmes
The institution presently has three educational programmes:
 College of Basic studies and Foundation Programme
 Centre for Safety Education
 Centre for Maritime and Offshore studies

Research Papers and Innovation

Awards and Recognitions

The University has received many recognitions. Some of them include

 NUGA Games 2011  Best University in the game of Chess
 Nigerian Society of Engineers (NSE) Best Engineering Department Award in 2015.
SPE Young Member Outstanding Services Award, Africa Regional, August, 2016 
SPE International Young Member Outstanding Services Award, 2017
5th Best Petroleum University in the world,2016
Most Fuel Efficient Urban Concept Gasoline Vehicle Prize at the 2nd Africa Shell Eco-marathon Competition, 2015.
Most Innovative Design Award Vehicle Prize at the 2nd Africa Shell Eco-marathon Competition 2015.

References

External links
National Universities Commission of Nigeria
Federal University of Petroleum Resources Effurun

Federal universities of Nigeria
Educational institutions established in 2007
2007 establishments in Nigeria
Petroleum engineering schools
Technological universities in Nigeria
Petroleum in Nigeria